Günter Orschel (born 6 August 1956) is a Bulgarian equestrian. He competed in two events at the 2000 Summer Olympics.

References

External links
 

1956 births
Living people
Bulgarian male equestrians
Olympic equestrians of Bulgaria
Equestrians at the 2000 Summer Olympics
People from Singen
Sportspeople from Freiburg (region)